Panhard is a French automotive company.

Panhard may also refer to:
 Panhard rod (Panhard suspension, Panhard) a suspension link originated by Panhard
 Panhard Nunatak (Panhard Ridge), Antarctica
 René Panhard (1841-1908) French automotive engineer

See also